Dracaena singularis is a species of succulent plant in the genus Dracaena native to Ethiopia, Kenya, and Tanzania. Mistakenly placed in the genus Boophane at first, by the 1980s the plant was corrected to be in the genus Sanseviera, until that entire genus was merged with Dracaena.

References

External links
 

singularis
Plants described in 1898